This is a list of the number-one hit singles in 1972 in Denmark. The charts were produced by the IFPI Danmark and were published in the newspaper Ekstra Bladet and, from October, broadcast on Danmarks Radio.

References 

1972 in Denmark
Denmark
Lists of number-one songs in Denmark